Pok Fu Lam Reservoir, formerly known as the Pokefulum Reservoir, is the first reservoir in Hong Kong. It is located in a valley in Pok Fu Lam.

History
Before the completion of the reservoir in 1863, the people in the city got their water by nearby streams or wells. These methods however were unable to support the rapid growth of the population since 1841. Diseases were caused by polluted water. The Hong Kong Government needed an urgent solution to the problem. Thus, it prepared a reward of 1,000 pounds to anyone who provided a solution to disease on 14 October 1859. The colonial government also allocated a budget of £25,000 for the project. On 29 February 1860, S. B. Rawling, a clerk from Royal Engineers suggested the construction of a dam across the valley of Pokfulam to collect rainwater. The reservoir was completed in 1863.

The construction did not meet the needs of the population because of budget-cuts, which left the dam to be far from adequate. Another reservoir above the original was built to meet the needs of the growing colony in 1877.

Monument declaration
6 Historic Structures of Pok Fu Lam Reservoir were declared as monuments in 2009. These include 4 masonry bridges, gauge basin and the Former Watchman's Cottage which is now Pok Fu Lam Management Centre.

References

Pok Fu Lam
Reservoirs in Hong Kong
Declared monuments of Hong Kong